André Rey (born 22 January 1948, in Strasbourg) is a French former professional footballer who played as a goalkeeper.

External links
RC Strasbourg archives 

1948 births
Living people
Footballers from Strasbourg
French footballers
Association football goalkeepers
Ligue 1 players
Ligue 2 players
RC Strasbourg Alsace players
FC Mulhouse players
FC Metz players
OGC Nice players
La Roche VF players
France international footballers